Katzenbach v. Morgan, 384 U.S. 641 (1966), was a landmark decision of the Supreme Court of the United States regarding the power of Congress, pursuant to Section 5 of the 14th Amendment, to enact laws that enforce and interpret provisions of the Constitution.

Background 
Prior to the 1960s, many US states and municipalities used literacy tests to disenfranchise minorities. In 1959, the Supreme Court of the United States held, in Lassiter v. Northampton County Board of Elections, that literacy tests were not necessarily violations of the Equal Protection Clause of the 14th Amendment, nor of the 15th Amendment.

In 1965, Congress passed the Voting Rights Act of 1965, which sought to safeguard the voting rights of disenfranchised minorities. Among other provisions, the Voting Rights Act made some literacy tests illegal. Section 4(e) was aimed at securing the franchisement of New York City's large Puerto Rican population and "provides that no person who has completed the sixth grade in a public school, or an accredited private school, in Puerto Rico in which the language of instruction was other than English shall be disfranchised for inability to read or write English."

Registered voters in the state of New York brought suit by alleging that Congress exceeded its powers of enforcement under the 14th Amendment and alleging that Congress infringed on rights reserved to states by the 10th Amendment.

Decision
By a 7–2 decision, the Supreme Court sided with Attorney General Nicholas Katzenbach, reversed the District Court, and held that Section 4(e) was constitutional. Writing the majority opinion, Justice Brennan stressed that Section 5 of the amendment is "a positive grant of legislative power authorizing Congress to exercise its discretion in determining the need for and nature of legislation to secure Fourteenth Amendment guarantees." Justice Brennan applied the appropriateness standard of McCulloch v. Maryland (1819) to determine whether the legislation passed constitutional muster.

Section 4(e) arguably expanded rights beyond what the Court had recognized in Lassiter, but Brennan ruled that Section 4(e) was appropriate. In doing so, he has often been credited with introducing the "ratchet theory" for congressional legislation enacted under Section 5. It held that Congress could ratchet up civil rights beyond what the Court had recognized, but Congress could not ratchet down judicially recognized rights. The "ratchet theory" essentially set judicially recognized rights as a support on which Congress could expand if it so chose. According to the theory, Brennan's opinion allowed for multiple interpreters of the Fourteenth Amendment, as opposed to just that of the judiciary.

In dissent, Justice Harlan criticized the "ratchet theory" and the idea of multiple interpreters of the 14th Amendment. Harlan relied on the separation of powers doctrine to argue that allowing Congress to interpret the 14th Amendment undercut the power of the judiciary. He objected to Congress having the power to interpret the 14th Amendment substantively (to create new rights). Harlan argued that the appropriate use of Section 5 power was the enforcement of judicially-recognized 14th Amendment rights.

Significance
Katzenbach v. Morgan is a prime example of judicial deference to Congressional authority. It allowed Congress great latitude in use of Section 5.

The Supreme Court, 31 years after Katzenbach, revisited the "ratchet" interpretation, in the case of City of Boerne v. Flores (1997) and stated, "This is not a necessary interpretation, however, or even the best one." By striking down the state application of the Religious Freedom Restoration Act of 1993, it addressed the separation of powers concerns that had been voiced earlier by Harlan.

See also
 List of United States Supreme Court cases, volume 384

Further reading

External links

United States Supreme Court cases
United States equal protection case law
United States elections case law
1966 in United States case law
Legal history of New York (state)
Puerto Rican diaspora
History of voting rights in the United States
Political history of New York City
United States Supreme Court cases of the Warren Court